Le Mesnil-Amelot is a commune in the Seine-et-Marne département in the Île-de-France region in north-central France. A large portion of Charles de Gaulle Airport is situated on Le Mesnil-Amelot's territory.

Demographics
Its inhabitants are called Mesnilois.

Education
There is one primary school in the community, Ecole publique Saint-Exupéry. Its current location opened in January 2008.

See also
Communes of the Seine-et-Marne department

References

External links

Home page 
1999 Land Use, from IAURIF (Institute for Urban Planning and Development of the Paris-Île-de-France région) 

Communes of Seine-et-Marne